The Northern Ireland Football Writers' Association Player of the Year (often called the NIFWA Player of the Year) is an annual award given to the player who is adjudged to have been the best of the season in the IFA Premiership. It is one of two association football Player of the Year awards in Northern Ireland, with the other being the Ulster Footballer of the Year award. The award has been presented since the 1969–70 season and the winner is chosen by a vote amongst members of the association. The first winner of the award was Des Dickson of Coleraine. The player to have received the award more than any other is Glenn Ferguson, who has collected the award on three occasions, the last of which was in 2006. Two other players have won the award twice; Ivan Murray was the first in 1975 and Vinny Arkins was the most recent, in 2002.

Winners

By player

By country

By club

See also
Ulster Footballer of the Year

Footnotes
A. : Player also won the Ulster Footballer of the Year award.
B. : Sourced to the official website of the Northern Ireland Football Writers' Association unless otherwise stated.
C. : Won the award on two occasions.
D. : Won the award three times.

References

External links
Official website

Association footballers in Northern Ireland
Northern Ireland 2
European football trophies and awards
Football mass media in the United Kingdom
Association football player non-biographical articles
Awards established in 1969
1969 establishments in Northern Ireland